The Mount Elizabeth Archeological Site, also known as Racey's Tuckahoe,  St. Joseph's Novitiate or the Mount Elizabeth Indian Mound is a prehistoric midden and an archaeological site in Jensen Beach, Florida. It is located in Martin County's Indian RiverSide Park, which includes the former Florida Institute of Technology (Jensen Beach Campus) east of Indian River Drive on the Indian River Lagoon.  On September 14, 2002, it was added to the National Register of Historic Places.

National Register listing
 Mount Elizabeth Archeological Site
 (added 2002 - Site - #02001011)
 Also known as Races (Racey's) Tuckahoe; St. Joseph's Novitiate
1707 NE Indian River Dr., Jensen Beach
 Historic Significance:  Information Potential
Area of Significance:  Prehistoric
Cultural Affiliation:  Late Archaic, Orange III Period, East Okeechobee Cultural Area
Period of Significance:  2000-2499 BC, 1500-1999 BC, 1000-1499 BC, 500-999 BC, 499-0 BC, 499-0 AD, 1000-500 AD
Owner:  Local Gov't
Historic Function:  Domestic, Religion
Historic Sub-function:  Religious Structure, Village Site
Current Function:  Landscape
Current Sub-function:  Park

See also
 Tuckahoe (Florida)
 Saint Joseph College of Florida
 National Register of Historic Places listings in Florida

References

External links
 Martin County listings at National Register of Historic Places
 Southeast Florida Archaeological Society calendar

Mounds in Florida
Native American history of Florida
Archaeological sites in Florida
National Register of Historic Places in Martin County, Florida
Geography of Martin County, Florida
Jensen Beach, Florida
Shell middens in Florida